The Czech Charity Challenge was a golf tournament on the Challenge Tour held in Bohemia (now part of the Czech Republic). It was played at Mariánské Lázně Golf Club in Marienbad, the oldest course in the country, opened in 1905. The tournament was succeeded by the Czech Open, a European Tour event held at the same venue from 1994 to 1996.

Winners

See also
Czech Open
D+D Real Czech Challenge

References

External links
Coverage on the Challenge Tour's official site

Former Challenge Tour events
Golf tournaments in the Czech Republic